Preetha Ram is Co-founder and Chief Executive Officer of Inquus Corporation (OpenStudy). She is on leave as Associate Dean for PreHealth and Science Education in the Office of Undergraduate Education of Emory University, where she was Founder and Executive Director of the Emory PreHealth Mentoring Office (PHMO), Founding Co-Director of the Emory-Tibet Science Initiative, and Founder and Director of Interdisciplinary Science Program for Integrating Science into Education. At Emory, she founded several educational initiatives, including Science Experience Abroad, ChemMentors peer-to-peer learning program that grew into the Supplemental Instruction model for Emory College, and International Research Experience for Science fellowships.

Early life and education 

Preetha Ram was born in Chennai, India where she grew up in a household with a younger brother and sister. Her father Rajagopalachari Parthasarathy, was a railway engineer and her mother, Choodamani, was a homemaker.

She received a Bachelor of Science in Chemistry from Women's Christian College in Chennai, India, later receiving a Master of Science in Chemistry from the Indian Institute of Technology Delhi. She left for the United States in 1983 to pursue a PhD in Chemistry. She first enrolled at the University of Illinois at Urbana-Champaign, where she met her soon-to-be husband, Ashwin Ram, whom she married in 1984. She left Illinois for Yale University in 1984 to pursue higher studies in biophysical chemistry. She received her PhD from Yale University in 1989, and her MBA from the Goizueta Business School in 2010. She lives in Palo Alto and has three children, Nikhil, Maya and Naveen.

Career 
Preetha Ram joined Emory University since 1989. As chemistry faculty, she taught Introductory Chemistry, Analytical Chemistry, and Physical Chemistry. She created a new problem-based learning approach to introductory science education, which she published and introduced to large freshman classes and small upper-division seminars. She was appointed Associate Faculty in Educational Studies, Director of Undergraduate Studies in Chemistry, and in 2005 moved to higher university administration as a dean in the Office of Undergraduate Education.

As founding co-directors of the Emory-Tibet Science Initiative (ETSI), Ram and Lobsang worked with the Dalai Lama to help develop a curriculum and instructional model for educating Tibetan monastics. Under her direction, ETSI faculty instructed Tibetan monastics on western science, including cosmology, biology, physics, chemistry, and neuroscience, balancing western thought with Buddhist theology. She edited the instructional handbooks, A Handbook of Science and The Structure of Science. ETSI plans to have "a comprehensive science curriculum" within the realm of monastic education in place at the major academic monastic institutions by 2013.

Ram believes that international experience abroad is a critical part of the college experience for all students, but most particularly science students. Ram pioneered the first science summer study abroad program at Emory, Chemistry Studies in Italy, and replicated the model with Neuroscience in France, Environmental Science and Biology in Australia, and Global Health in South Africa. Her study abroad program won the Best Practices in International Education Award in 2007.

Preetha Ram is a member of Project Kaleidoscope.

References 

1961 births
Living people
Women academic administrators
University of Illinois alumni
Goizueta Business School alumni
Indian emigrants to the United States
Emory University faculty
Yale University alumni
IIT Delhi alumni
American people of Indian descent
American businesspeople
American science writers
Indian women science writers
Indian technology writers
American women writers of Indian descent
Indian academic administrators
American academic administrators
Businesspeople from Chennai
Businesswomen from Tamil Nadu
American women non-fiction writers
American women academics
21st-century American women